←2009 - 2010 - 2011→

This is a list of Japanese television dramas shown within Japan during the year of 2010.

Winter

References

2010 Japanese television dramas
Dramas